Tucurú is a small town and municipality in the Guatemalan department of Alta Verapaz.

History

Verapaz Railroad

The Verapaz Railroad began on 15 January 1894 with a contract for 99 years between Guatemala, then ruled by president José María Reina Barrios and Walter Dauch, representative of the "Verapaz Railroad & Northern Agency Ltd." The contract settled the rules for the construction and maintenance of a 30 mile railroad line between Panzós and Pancajché. Passenger service travelled twice a week, on Mondays and Thursdays; mail also arrived by ship every Wednesday and cargo came from Livingston, Izabal. Besides, there were train stops in Santa Rosita, Santa Catalina La Tinta, and Papalhá.

In 1898, it was reported that given the coffee prosperity in Cobán, which in those days was the third largest city in Guatemala, the railroad was going to be extended to that city.  The railroad was in operation until 1965, when it was superseded by truck and highways.

Thomae family

One of the most powerful German families that settled in the region by the end of the 19th century was the Thomae family, who had their headquarters in neighbor Purulhá.  Mauricio Thomae's early farmland had the following haciendas:

Years later, during general Jorge Ubico's presidency (1931-1944), Thomae went on to become one of the most influential landlords in the German Verapaz, along with the Sarg, Sapper and Diesseldorf families.  Ubico had been governor of Cobán during Manuel Estrada Cabrera 22-year regime and befriended several German families, including the Thomaes.

Climate

Tucurú has a tropical rainforest climate (Köppen: Af).

Geographic location

See also

 Alta Verapaz Department

Notes and references

References

Bibliography

External links
 Tucurú information

Municipalities of the Alta Verapaz Department